The Iraqi Basketball Association (IBA) is the governing body of basketball in Iraq.

The association founded in 1948, represents basketball with public authorities as well as with national and international sports organizations and as such with Iraq in international competitions. It also defends the moral and material interests of Basketball in Iraq. It is affiliated with FIBA and FIBA Asia.

The association also organizes the Iraq men's national basketball team and the Iraq women's national basketball team.

Leagues
Iraqi Basketball League

References

External links
Official website of the Iraqi Basketball Association
FIBA Profile

1948 establishments in Iraq
Basketball in Iraq
Basketball
Basketball governing bodies in Asia
Sports organizations established in 1948